Ann(e), Annie or Anna Hudson may refer to:

Annie Hudson (MBE) in 1938 Birthday Honours
Anne Hudson, winner of The Liffey Swim
Anne Hudson, TV and radio presenter
Anne Hudson (literary historian) (born 1938), British literary historian
Anne Lester Hudson, American mathematics professor
Ann Hudson, character in WIOU (TV series)
Anna Hudson, US writer